Ashok Laxmanrao Kukade is an Indian surgeon and author, who was awarded Padma Bhushan (2019), India's third-highest civilian award for his work in the medical field. He is the co-founder of Vivekanand Hospital and Research Center along with Dr.Firke, Dr.Alurkar in Latur, Maharashtra.

Publications

References

Year of birth missing (living people)
Indian medical writers
Indian surgeons
Living people
Medical doctors from Maharashtra
Recipients of the Padma Bhushan in medicine